The 2009 Euroleague Final Four was the concluding Euroleague Final Four tournament of the 2008–09 Euroleague season. It was held on May, 2009. All of the games were held at the O2 World, in Berlin Germany. Panathinaikos won the title, which was their fifth at the time.

Bracket

Semifinals

FC Barcelona vs. CSKA Moscow

Olympiacos vs. Panathinaikos

Third-place playoff

Final

Awards

Euroleague Final Four MVP 
 Vassilis Spanoulis ( Panathinaikos)

Euroleague Finals Top Scorer 
 J.R. Holden ( CSKA Moscow)

External links 
Official Site

Final Four
2008–09
Sports competitions in Berlin
International basketball competitions hosted by Germany
2008–09 in German basketball
2008–09 in Spanish basketball
2008–09 in Greek basketball
2008–09 in Russian basketball